Hill stations are high-altitude towns for recreation, enjoyment and used as a place of refuge to escape the blistering heat in India during summertime. As India is a vast country with limited amounts of the coastal area most of its towns and districts face continental type of climate with summer being very hot so hill stations (as situated on high altitude due to which it faces low temperature) becomes an excellent spot to escape such hot and humid conditions as well as a place of enjoyment to spent quality time with your family and partner during summer break.

The Indian subcontinent has seven principal mountain ranges and the largest of all is the Himalayas that lies in the northern part of India. The famous peaks and ranges include the Kangchenjunga range in the Eastern Himalayas which frames the hill stations of Darjeeling and Gangtok as well as the Nanda Devi in Uttarakhand. The Shivalik range that also lies within the same region also has some famous hill stations that include Mussoorie, Drass, Dalhousie, Kullu, Shimla, Nainital and many more.

Most of the hill stations in India were developed by the British around a central mall to get respite from the oppressive summer heat. Many have picturesque lakes as their focal point, making them excellent places for boating activities.

Most of the hill stations in India are located in the states of Jammu and Kashmir, Ladakh, Manipur, Himachal Pradesh, Uttarakhand, Sikkim, West Bengal, Arunachal Pradesh, Nagaland and Meghalaya in the Himalayas and in the states of Gujarat, Maharashtra, Karnataka, Goa, Kerala, and Tamil Nadu in Western ghats. Some are located in Eastern ghats of Tamil Nadu, Andhra Pradesh, Odisha and West Bengal. Some of the hill stations in India are listed below by state.

Since a number of these hill stations attract large numbers of tourists in summer as well as other times of the year, they are well connected by rail, road, and air services to major Indian cities.

History

Nandi Hills was developed by Ganga Dynasty in 11th century. It was also used by Tipu Sultan (1751 - 1799) as a summer retreat.

Hill stations in British India were established for a variety of reasons. After the revolt of 1857 the "British sought further distance from what they saw as a "disease-ridden" land by escape to the Himalayas in the north and Nilgiri Hills in the south", a pattern which started even before 1857. Other factors included anxieties about the dangers of life in India, among them "fear of degeneration brought on by too long residence in a debilitating land." The hill stations were meant to reproduce the home country, illustrated in Lord Lytton's statement about Ootacamund, in the 1870s, "such beautiful English rain, such delicious English mud." Shimla was officially made the "summer capital of India" in the 1860s and hill stations "served as vital centers of political and military power, especially after the 1857 revolt."

Dane Kennedy, following Monika Bührlein, identifies three stages in the evolution of hill stations in India: high refuge to hill station, and hill station to town. The first settlements started in the 1820s, primarily as sanitoria. In the 1840s and 1850s, there was a wave of new hill stations, with the main impetus being "places to rest and recuperate from the arduous life on the plains". In the second half of the 19th century, there was a period of consolidation with few new hill stations. In the final phase, "hill stations reached their zenith in the late nineteenth century. The political importance of the official stations was underscored by the inauguration of large and costly public-building projects."

Andaman and Nicobar Islands 

 Mount Harriett

Andhra Pradesh

Arunachal Pradesh

Assam

Bihar

Chhattisgarh

Goa

Gujarat

Haryana

Dhoshi -haryana

Himachal Pradesh

Jammu and Kashmir

Jharkhand

Karnataka

Kerala

Ladakh

Madhya Pradesh

Maharashtra

Manipur

Meghalaya

Mizoram

Nagaland

Odisha

Rajasthan

Sikkim

Tamil Nadu

Telangana

Tripura

Uttarakhand

West Bengal

See also
List of Indian states and union territories by highest point
Skiing in India

References

Hill stations
Hill stations